Jozef Majoroš (born 21 March 1978) is a Slovak football coach, who is last managed Michalovce.

Honours

Manager
VSS Košice
DOXXbet liga: Winners: 2016–17

References

External links
FC VSS Košice official club profile
Futbalnet profile

1978 births
Living people
Slovak footballers
Association football midfielders
FC VSS Košice players
FC Petržalka players
FC Lokomotíva Košice players
FK Bodva Moldava nad Bodvou players
FC VSS Košice managers
MFK Zemplín Michalovce managers
Slovak Super Liga managers
Sportspeople from Košice
Slovak football managers